Nicolas de Bralion  (1600–1672) was a French oratorian and ecclesiastical writer who was influential on bringing various Italian ideas into France.  De Bralion joined the Paris Oratory in 1619 and published a number of historical and religious books.

External links
 Catholic Encyclopedia Article

1600 births
1672 deaths
French religious writers
French male non-fiction writers